The keeled water skink (Cophoscincopus durus) is a species of lizard in the family Scincidae. It is found in western Africa.

References

Cophoscincopus
Reptiles described in 1862
Taxa named by Edward Drinker Cope